The R350 road is a regional road in Ireland starting in Loughrea Main St and going north for 12 km before terminating at the R348.
En route it passes through Bullaun and passes close to the Turoe stone.

See also
Roads in Ireland
National primary road
National secondary road

References
Roads Act 1993 (Classification of Regional Roads) Order 2006 – Department of Transport

Regional roads in the Republic of Ireland
Roads in County Galway